is a Japanese manga series written and illustrated by Jiro Taniguchi. It was serialized in Big Comic and published in one volume by Shogakukan in November 1994.

Media

Manga
The series is written and illustrated by Jiro Taniguchi. The series was serialized in Big Comic and published by Shogakukan in a single tankōbon volume, which was released in Japan on November 30, 1994.

In 2020, Fanfare and Ponent Mon announced they licensed the series for English publication.

Other media
Tottori, Taniguchi's hometown, created a committee to adapt the manga into a film. The series was also used as a base by artists of a sand sculpture that was built by Taniguchi's hometown after his death.

Reception
In 2002, it won the Haxtur Award for Best Long Comic Strip. In 2015, the series won the award for the best translated comic at the Sproing Awards. Also in 2015, the series was awarded the National Comic Book Classics Award at Amadora BD. In 2021, the series was nominated for the Eisner Award for Best U.S. Edition of International Material—Asia.

Raimaru from Manga News praised the series, calling it "full of emotion". The columnists for BD Guest also praised it for the same reason as Raimaru. Rebecca Silverman from Anime News Network also praised the series, calling it "thoughtful and emotional", while calling the narrative "unbalanced [at times]".

References

External links

 

1994 manga
Jiro Taniguchi
Seinen manga
Shogakukan manga